Elmer Clair Pence (August 17, 1900 – September 17, 1968) was an outfielder in Major League Baseball. He played for the Chicago White Sox in 1922.

References

External links

1900 births
1968 deaths
Major League Baseball outfielders
Chicago White Sox players
Baseball players from California
People from Calaveras County, California